Chen Junefi (born 15 May 1992) is a Paralympian athlete from China competing mainly in T38 classification sprint events.

Chen represented her country at the 2012 Summer Paralympics in London, where she won three medals; a gold in the 100m sprint and silvers in both the 200m sprint and the women's 4 x 100m relay (T35-38). As well as her Paralympic success Chen has won medals at both World Championships and the Asian Para Games, dominating her classification in the 2014 Asian Games in Incheon, where she took home four gold medals.

Personal history
Chen was born in China in 1992. She has an impairment to her left hand. She lives in Hunan Province and received her higher education at Tianshui City Sports Institute. She is a professional athlete.

Notes

Paralympic athletes of China
Athletes (track and field) at the 2012 Summer Paralympics
Athletes (track and field) at the 2016 Summer Paralympics
Paralympic gold medalists for China
Paralympic silver medalists for China
Living people
1992 births
Medalists at the 2012 Summer Paralympics
Medalists at the 2016 Summer Paralympics
Chinese female sprinters
Paralympic medalists in athletics (track and field)
21st-century Chinese women